Phyllis Virginia "Bebe" Daniels (January 14, 1901 – March 16, 1971) was an American actress, singer, dancer, writer, and producer.

She began her career in Hollywood during the silent film era as a child actress, became a star in musicals such as Rio Rita, and later gained further fame on radio and television in Britain. Over the course of her 50-year career, Daniels appeared in 230 films.

Early life and career
Daniels was born Phyllis Virginia Daniels (Bebe was a childhood nickname) in Dallas, Texas. Her father was a travelling theater manager, Scottish-born Melville Daniel MacNeal, who changed his name to Danny Daniels after a disagreement with his own father over his ambition to change from the medical profession to show business. Her mother was Phyllis de Forest Griffin, born in Colombia of an American father and a Colombian mother, a stage actress who was in Danny's travelling stock company when their child was born. At the age of ten weeks her father proudly carried her on stage even though there was no part in the play for a baby. 

The family moved to Los Angeles, California in her childhood, and she began her acting career at the age of four in the first version of The Squaw Man. The same year, she went on tour in a stage production of Shakespeare's Richard III. The following year, she participated in productions by Oliver Morosco and David Belasco.

By the age of seven, Daniels had her first starring role in film as the young heroine in A Common Enemy. At the age of nine, she starred as Dorothy Gale in the 1910 short film The Wonderful Wizard of Oz. At the age of 14, she was hired by comedy producer Hal Roach at $5 a day, to star opposite Roach's star comedian Harold Lloyd in a series of one-reel comedies, starting with the 1915 film Giving Them Fits. Lloyd and Daniels eventually developed a romantic relationship that was well publicized; they were known in Hollywood as "The Boy" and "The Girl."

In 1919, she declined to renew her contract with Hal Roach, because she wanted to be a dramatic actress. She accepted an offer from producer-director Cecil B. DeMille, who gave her secondary roles in Male and Female (1919), Why Change Your Wife? (1920), and The Affairs of Anatol (1921).

Hollywood career

In the 1920s, Daniels was under contract with Paramount Pictures. She made the transition from child star to adult in Hollywood in 1922 and by 1924 was playing opposite Rudolph Valentino in Monsieur Beaucaire. Following this, she was cast in a number of light popular films, namely Miss Bluebeard, The Manicure Girl, and Wild Wild Susan. Paramount dropped her contract with the advent of talking pictures. Daniels was hired by the new studio Radio Pictures (later known as RKO Radio) to star in its first feature, the Technicolor musical Rio Rita, co-starring the comedy team of Bert Wheeler and Robert Woolsey. Rio Rita turned out not to be RKO's inaugural film due to production delays, but it was still one of the most successful films of that year. Bebe Daniels became established as a musical star, and RCA Victor hired her to record several records for their catalog.

Radio Pictures starred her in a number of musicals including Dixiana (1930) and Love Comes Along (1930). Toward the end of 1930, Bebe Daniels appeared in the musical comedy Reaching for the Moon, released through United Artists. However, by this time, musicals had gone out of fashion, and most of the musical numbers from the film had to be removed before it could be released. Daniels had become associated with musicals, and Radio Pictures did not renew her contract. Warner Bros. realized she was a boxoffice draw, and she was offered a contract. During her years at Warner Bros., she starred in My Past (1931), Honor of the Family (1931), and the 1931 pre-code version of The Maltese Falcon. In 1932, she appeared in Silver Dollar (1932) and the successful Busby Berkeley choreographed musical comedy 42nd Street (1933) in which she sang once again. The same year, she played in Counsellor at Law. Her last film for Warner Bros. was Registered Nurse (1934).

Stalking incidents

In 1934, Daniels and husband Ben Lyon, whom she had married in June 1930, garnered press attention while having to testify against Albert F. Holland, a 36-year-old World War I veteran with a history of stalking Daniels. Holland had been under the delusion that he had attended school with Daniels and that they had married in Mexico in 1925. In 1931, he broke into Daniels' hotel room in San Francisco, confronting and terrifying her, and had to be removed by security. He was arrested and committed to the Arizona State Asylum. Holland escaped from the institution in 1932, and began sending more than 150 threatening letters to Daniels. Arrested once more, he was again placed in a psychiatric institution. 

Following his release, another confrontation took place, and Holland was again arrested. A lengthy trial in Los Angeles took place, with Holland conducting most of his own defense, including a lengthy cross-examination of Daniels' husband, Ben Lyon. Actress Doris Kenyon, a friend of Daniels and Lyon, testified for the prosecution. Ultimately, the jury found Holland to be mentally unfit, and he was committed to a psychiatric facility for an indefinite period. Daniels and Lyon subsequently moved to London.

Career in London and later
Bebe Daniels retired from Hollywood in 1935 with her husband, film actor Ben Lyon, and their two children, and moved to London. In February 1939, Daniels and Lyon co-starred in a series of commercial radio shows, the Rinso Radio Revue, recorded in London for Radio Luxembourg. They and Bebe's mother Phyllis all returned to the U.S. on 14 June 1939, leaving their children in Los Angeles in the care of Phyllis, and returned to London seven weeks later. After the start of World War II, they worked for the BBC, starring in the comedy radio series Hi Gang!. Born from an idea by Ben, and with most of the dialogue by Bebe, it enjoyed considerable popularity. A few years later, Daniels starred in the London production of Panama Hattie in the title role originated by Ethel Merman. The couple remained in England through the days of The Blitz.

Following the war, Daniels was awarded the Medal of Freedom by Harry S Truman for war service. In 1945, she returned to Hollywood for a short time to work as a film producer for Hal Roach and Eagle-Lion Films. She returned to the UK in 1948 and lived there for the remainder of her life. Daniels, her husband, her son Richard and her daughter Barbara all starred in the radio sitcom Life with the Lyons (1951 to 1961), which later made the transition to television.

Personal life
Daniels married actor Ben Lyon in June 1930. They had two children: daughter Barbara in 1932 and a son Richard (born Bryan Moore in 1935), whom they adopted from a London orphanage. In an issue of the contemporary magazine Radio Pictorial, she explained how she saw Richard peering through the railings and instantly thought "A brother for Barbara".

Daniels suffered a severe stroke in 1963 and withdrew from public life. She suffered a second stroke in late 1970. On March 16, 1971, Daniels died of a cerebral hemorrhage in London at the age of 70. Her remains were cremated at London's Golders Green Crematorium and the ashes returned to the United States; she was interred at the Chapel Columbarium at Hollywood Forever Cemetery. Upon his death in 1979, Ben Lyon's remains were interred next to Daniels'.

A biography Bebe and Ben was written by Jill Allgood, a personal friend who worked with them at the BBC.

Selected filmography

Selected radio performances

Bibliography

Footnotes

External links

 
 
 
 Good Little Bad Girl: Bebe Daniels
 Photographs and bibliography
 Bebe Daniels' maternal grandmother's family

1901 births
1971 deaths
20th-century American actresses
American child actresses
American expatriate actresses in the United Kingdom
American film actresses
American film producers
American musical theatre actresses
American silent film actresses
American stage actresses
American radio actresses
American television actresses
American television producers
American women television producers
American people of Scottish descent
American people of Colombian descent
Burials at Hollywood Forever Cemetery
Paramount Pictures contract players
Recipients of the Medal of Freedom
American women screenwriters
Warner Bros. contract players
20th-century American women writers
20th-century American singers
20th-century American businesspeople
20th-century American businesswomen
20th-century American women singers
American women film producers
20th-century American screenwriters
Golders Green Crematorium